Lithops vallis-mariae is a species of plant in the family Aizoaceae. It is endemic to Namibia.  Its natural habitat is subtropical or tropical dry shrubland. It is threatened by habitat loss.

References

vallismariae
Endemic flora of Namibia
Least concern plants
Taxonomy articles created by Polbot